Gustavia latifolia is a species of woody plant in the family Lecythidaceae. It is found only in Colombia.

References

latifolia
Endemic flora of Colombia
Taxonomy articles created by Polbot

Endangered flora of South America